The 2022–23 Stonehill Skyhawks men's basketball team represented Stonehill College in the 2022–23 NCAA Division I men's basketball season. The Skyhawks, led by tenth-year head coach Chris Kraus, played their home games at Merkert Gymnasium in Easton, Massachusetts, as first-year members of the Northeast Conference.

This season was Stonehill's first year of a four-year transition period from Division II to Division I. As a result, the Skyhawks were not eligible for NCAA postseason play until the 2026–27 season.

Previous season
The Skyhawks finished the previous season 15–12, 10–9 in NE-10 play to finish in fourth place in the Northeast Division. In the first round of the Northeast-10 Tournament, they defeated Le Moyne in the first round, before falling to Pace in the quarterfinals.

Preseason polls

Northeast Conference poll
The Northeast Conference released its preseason coaches' poll on October 19, 2022. The Skyhawks were picked to finish last in the conference.

() first place votes

Preseason All-Conference Team
No Skyhawks were selected as members of the NEC Preseason All-Conference Team.

Season notes
Five of the Skyhawks' top six scorers from the previous season returned.

The Skyhawks opened their inaugural Division I season against UConn at XL Center in Hartford, Connecticut on November 7, 2022. The Skyhawks fell, 85–54. Cole Bergan scored the first point for Stonehill as a Division I team on a free throw.

Stonehill's Division I home opener was on November 10, 2022, against Quinnipiac. The Skyhawks dropped a 102–95 decision in their first meeting with Quinnipiac, since the two teams were in the same Division II conference in 1998.

The Skyhawks' first Division I win came on November 12, 2022, when they used a 7–1 run to close the game and defeat Army West Point on the road, 82–77. Isaiah Burnett's jump shot in the final minute put Stonehill in front, 77–76, and they hit their free throws down the stretch to put the game away. The Skyhawks shot 52.% from the field and were led by Andrew Sims, who shot 9 for 11 and added eight rebounds and two blocked shots. Burnett had 19 points for Stonehill, and Thatcher Stone added 15.

On November 19, Stonehill overcame an 11-point second-half deficit at the Tom Konchalski Classic at Fordham University to defeat Holy Cross, 81–79. After the Skyhawks had taken a three-point lead, the Crusaders tied the game at 79 with 11 seconds to play. With Stonehill out of time outs, Josh Mack brought the ball up the court, backed into position in the paint, and hit a contested hook shot that banked in with 2.1 seconds remaining to give Stonehill the win. Mack scored a season-high 10 points, and had four rebounds, two assists and a blocked shot. Through five games over the season's first two weeks, the Skyhawks led the NEC in field goal percentage at 49.5%, effective field goal percentage at 56.6%, and free throw percentage at 83.7%. They were second in three-point field goal percentage 38.1%.

Two Skyhawks earned Northeast Conference Player of the Week honors during the first two weeks of the season: Andrew Sims and Isaiah Burnett. Sims averaged 19.0 points, 4.3 rebounds, 1.7 assists and 1.0 blocks over first three games of the season. He shot 64.7% from the field and 90.9% from the free-throw line. He came off the bench to score a team-high 12 points at UConn in the season opener, and 18 of his 24 points in the second half against Quinnipiac in the Skyhawks' home opener. In his first start, Sims had a game-high 21 points while shooting 9–11 and collecting eight rebounds against Army West Point. Sims finished his first week ranked second in the NEC in both scoring and field goal accuracy.

Burnett averaged 20.0 points, 3.5 rebounds, 2.0 assists, 2.5 steals and 1.0 block per game during the second week of the season. He shot 64.7% from the field, 84.2% from the line and hit both his three-point attempts. After scoring 10 points at Providence, Burnett had a career-high 30 points on just nine shots from the field, making seven, and shot 15 for 17 from the free-throw line in the neutral-court win over Holy Cross. He also had four steals in the game. Burnett gave Stonehill a one-point lead with 2:49 to play on a three-point play and then hit three key free throws in the final 1:01.

Despite the Skyhawks losing two of their three games at the Tom Konchalski Classic, two Stonehill players, Andrew Sims and Isaiah Burnett, were named to the All-Tournament team.

Through the season's first three and four weeks, Stonehill led NCAA Division I in free-throw shooting percentage.

Josh Mack hit a three-pointer from the left wing at the buzzer off a pass from Cole Bergen to give Stonehill a dramatic 69–66 victory at Binghamton on December 3. The Skyhawks had a four-point lead with 18 seconds to play, only to see Binghamton tie the game with only five seconds remaining. However, without any timeouts, Stonehill was able to push the ball up the floor for the game-winning shot. Andrew Sims led the Skyhawks with 22 points.

Skyhawks' head coach Chris Kraus was voted Jim Phelan Coach of the Year by the NEC's coaches.

Stonehill had three all-conference players, the most ever by a first-year NEC program, and tied for the most among NEC teams this season. Fifth-year senior Andrew Sims was selected to the first team. He ranked sixth in the league in scoring at 15.2 points per game. Isaiah Burnett earned a second-team selection by ranking second in the NEC and fourth nationally with 2.8 steals per game. Graduate student forward Max Zegarowski shot 45.6% from three-point range during conference play to merit a third-team selection. He ranked second overall in three-point shooting accuracy at 41.9%.

Roster

Schedule and results

|-
!colspan=12 style=""| Regular season

Sources

See also
2022–23 Stonehill Skyhawks women's basketball team

References

Stonehill Skyhawks men's basketball seasons
Stonehill Skyhawks
Stonehill Skyhawks men's basketball
Stonehill Skyhawks men's basketball